Weybourne Priory was a small Augustinian medieval monastic house in Weybourne, Norfolk, England.

It was founded around 1200 AD by Sir Ralph de Meyngaren (Mainwearing). It was at first subordinate to West Acre Priory but independent from 1314.

By 1494 only one prior and three canons lived there. At a visitation in 1514, there was only the prior and one canon. It was dissolved in 1536. Thomas Bulman, the prior, obtained a pension of £4; he was presented to the Norfolk rectory of Egmere in 1543. After its suppression, the priory was granted to John Gresham.

The standing remains of the priory are Grade I listed
and the site is a Scheduled Ancient Monument.

References

See also

List of monastic houses in Norfolk
List of monastic houses in England

Augustinian monasteries in England
Monasteries in Norfolk
North Norfolk